João Silvério Trevisan (born June 23, 1944 in Ribeirão Bonito, São Paulo) is Brazilian author, playwright, journalist, screenwriter and film director. In his much-diversified oeuvres, he has published eleven books, among them great works of fiction, essays, short stories, and screenplays. Trevisan has been influential as a literary and cultural critic, particularly on gay and lesbian issues and his works have been translated into English, Spanish, and German.

Career
Early in his career in 1970, Trevisan wrote and directed a feature film, Orgia ou o Homem que Deu Cria, which was censured by the Brazilian military regime for almost ten years. In 1976, however, Trevisan wrote his first book, Testamento de Jônatas Deixado a Davi, and in 1983, Em Nome do Desejo. He subsequently emerged as one of Brazil's more important literary figures due to the enormous quantity and quality of work produced over the course of his career on a variety of topics. In 2010, one of his many short stories, The Secret Friend, was adapted to a short film directed by Flavio Alves. The film was shot in Brooklyn, and entered more than 80 film festivals and won 21 awards all over the world, including Best of the Fest at Palm Springs International Film Festival, the Storyteller Award at Savannah Film Festival, and the Van Gogh Award at the Amsterdam Film Festival, among others.

Literary prizes
Trevisan's best-known literary work, Two Bodies in Vertigoo is part of the anthology The 100 Best Brazilian Story Tales of the Twentieth Century. He has been honored three times with Premix Jabuti, which is the most prestigious Brazilian literary award and three times with the Association of Art Critics of São Paulo (APCA) Award, as well as several other honors. Yet, despite the numerous awards and distinctions, his work has been ignored by the Brazilian mainstream media.

Gay activism
Between 1973 and 1976, Trevisan lived in Mexico and in the United States, where he had direct contact with the gay rights movement. Not surprisingly, in 1978, he founded, SOMOS, the first gay rights organization in Brazil and, in the same year, the first gay news publication, O Lampião da Esquina. In 1982, he started research for his book, Devassos no Paraiso (Perverts in Paradise), which became at the time the most comprehensive study of the history of homosexuality in Brazil.

Personal life
He currently resides in São Paulo, Brazil.

Body of work
Film, as screenplay writer

 Contestação (short film, 1969) 
 Orgia ou o homem que deu cria (feature length, 1971)
 Amigo Secreto (The Secret Friend, 2010)

Journalism

 O Lampião da Esquina

Literature
 Testamento de Jônatas Deixado a David (1976)
 As Incríveis Aventuras de El Cóndor (1980)
 Em Nome do Desejo (1983)
 Vagas Notícias de Melinha Marchiotti (1984)
 Devassos no Paraíso; also in English: Perverts in Paradise (1986)
 O Livro do Avesso (1992)
 Ana em Veneza; also Ana in Venice (1994)
 Troços & Destroços (1997)
 Seis Balas num Buraco Só: A Crise do Masculino (1998)
 Pedaço de Mim (2002)
 O Rei do Cheiro (2010)

Screenplay (adaptations)

 Doramundo by Geraldo Ferraz, directed by João Batista de Andrade (first treatment, 1977) - best film, scenography and director, Festival de Gramado, 1978
 A mulher que inventou o amor by Jean Garrett, (1981)

Theater

 Heliogábalo & Eu
 Em Nome do Desejo
 Troços & Destroços

See also 

 Literature of Brazil 
 The Secret Friend official web site

References 

1944 births
Brazilian people of Italian descent
Living people
Brazilian LGBT rights activists
Brazilian LGBT novelists
Brazilian LGBT screenwriters
Brazilian LGBT dramatists and playwrights
20th-century Brazilian novelists
Brazilian male novelists
Brazilian male short story writers
20th-century Brazilian short story writers
20th-century Brazilian dramatists and playwrights
Brazilian male dramatists and playwrights
Brazilian screenwriters
Brazilian journalists
Brazilian film directors
Gay novelists
Gay screenwriters
Gay dramatists and playwrights
20th-century Brazilian male writers
21st-century Brazilian novelists
21st-century Brazilian short story writers
21st-century Brazilian dramatists and playwrights